The Appalachian Long Distance Hikers Association or ALDHA-East is a non-profit organization founded in 1983 to support and promote the interests of Appalachian Trail long-distance hikers.  It "was the first organization of long-distance hikers in the United States".

Activities

The ALDHA authors the annual Appalachian Trail Thru-Hikers' Companion, a guide to hiking the Appalachian Trail (A.T.).  It also publishes a quarterly newsletter, The Long-Distance Hiker.

An annual event is the ALDHA Gathering with hiking- and trail-oriented workshops about trails worldwide.  It is usually held over Columbus Day weekend and has hundreds of experienced hikers in attendance.

Backpacker ethics education

In 1990 the ALDHA published of a list of behavioral expectations for hikers staying in hostels to prevent problems and improve public perception of A.T. backpackers.  

Since 1995, the "Endangered Services Campaign" has provided backpacker etiquette education and encouraged hikers to "act responsibly when they are in trail towns as well as on the trail."  One slogan in the campaign was "Just because you live in the woods doesn't mean you can act like an animal." 

The "Hike In Harmony" campaign uses the yin and yang symbol with boot footprints and distills and adapts Leave No Trace principles into three basic ethics rules for A.T. backpackers:

See also
 Appalachian Trail Conservancy
 Appalachian Trail Museum
 Leave No Trace

Further reading
 Berger, Karen (2000) Hiking the Triple Crown" Seattle Washington: The Mountaineers Books, 2001
 Bruce, Dan (2000) The Thru-Hiker's Handbook Hot Springs, North Carolina: Center for Appalachian Trail Studies.
 Shaffer, Earl V. (1983) Walking With Spring'' Harper's Ferry, West Virginia: the Appalachian Trail Conference.

References

External links
 Appalachian Long Distance Hikers Association

Appalachian Trail
Hiking in the United States
Hiking organizations in the United States
Non-profit organizations based in New Hampshire
1983 establishments in the United States